The Department of Markets and Transport was an Australian government department that existed between December 1928 and April 1930.

History
When the Department was abolished, it was split into the Department of Markets (II) and the Department of Transport (I), and its functions divided between the two entities.

Scope
Information about the department's functions and/or government funding allocation could be found in the Administrative Arrangements Orders, the annual Portfolio Budget Statements and in the Department's annual reports.

At its creation, the Department was responsible for the following:
Advances for purchase of wire and wire netting by settlers 
Assisting the following organisations
Dairy Produce Export Control Board
Dried Fruits Export Control Board  
Dried Fruits Advances Repayments Board  
Australian Dairy Council, and the   
Canned Fruits Export Control 
Board Board of Trade Collections and dissemination of commercial and industrial information 
Inspection, grading, packing and marketing of butter, cheese and other dairy products, meat, fresh, dried and canned fruits, seeds, vegetables, jams, honey etc., exported from the Commonwealth 
Lighthouses, Lightships, Beacons and Buoys 
Matters connected with the overseas marketing of Australian produce exported, including applications for financial assistance in connexion therewith 
Navigation and shipping 
Railways 
Representation at International Exhibitions 
Rural credits 
Trade publicity and advertising in the United Kingdom and other overseas countries 
War Service Homes.

Structure
The Department was a Commonwealth Public Service department, staffed by officials who were responsible to the Minister for Markets and Transport, Thomas Paterson until October 1929 and then Parker Moloney.

References

Ministries established in 1928
Markets and Transport
Defunct transport organisations based in Australia
1928 establishments in Australia
1930 disestablishments in Australia